The OM651 is a family of inline-four cylinder automobile diesel engines introduced by Mercedes-Benz in 2008.

Design 
The main goal was to create a common engine design that maximized the parts commonality between the engines manufactured by parent company, Daimler.

One requirement of the design was the ability of the engine to be mounted both longitudinally and transversely. Improved fuel efficiency and compliance with Euro 5 emission standards were also design objectives, by 2010 being updated to the Euro 6 standard; four piezo-electric injectors fed with very high pressure fuel from a common rail inject fuel directly into the combustion chambers to improve combustion compared to previous Mercedes Diesel engines and recirculated exhaust gas reduces the oxygen in the cylinders to "starve" any reactions that would produce NO(x).

There are 6 variants in all. Of these 4 variants of the engine have the same  swept volume, tuned to different power outputs
The  and  versions employ a 2 stage (bi-turbo) charging setup with a small, high pressure turbo providing quick boost at low RPM fed by a large, lower pressure turbo providing increased  performance at higher RPM, then at highest rpm ranges and loads, using both simultaneously. The lower output version has only a single turbocharger.
There are also 2 shorter stroke "square" variants of this engine with 1.8 litre displacement   (badged A/B180)  (badged A/B200 and used only in smaller front wheel drive models like the A-Bclass). These two variants differ only in electronic tune, and have a single turbocharger.

See also
 List of Mercedes-Benz engines
 List of engines used in Chrysler products

References

OM651
Diesel engines by model
Straight-four engines